East End × Yuri (pronounced “East End Plus Yuri”) was a short-lived collaboration between Japanese hip hop group East End and singer Yuri Ichii, ex-member of J-pop girl group Tokyo Performance Doll.

Members

East End members are:
Gaku (MC) (born October 10, 1970)
ROCK-Tee (DJ) (born December 8, 1970)
Yoggy (DJ) (born May 5, 1970).

History

Members Gaku and Yoggy were friends in high school, initially bonding over a mutual interest in breakdancing. In their second year of high school, the duo participated in rap contests as "Funky New Style." They became acquainted with future member ROCK-Tee at one of these events. Later, when entering college, Gaku ran into ROCK-Tee, and informally organized East End. East End’s first live performance was at an event called “Peace Ball,” in 1990. Many acts that are still famous in Japan today were in attendance, including DJ Honda, DJ Krush, Boy-Ken, DJ Yas, and others. East End continued as an independent act, and released their debut studio album Beginning of the End in 1992, but garnered little mainstream attention. In 1994, the group released the EP denim-ed soul, accompanied by the single “Da.Yo.Ne.” The album and single featured Yuri Ichii, together under the new collaborative name EAST END x YURI. Initially sales were modest, but in the following year, "Da.Yo.Ne" attracted a large audience through radio play across Japan. It is speculated that it reached major radio stations because of its promotion through Tower Records in Hokkaido. 

Essentially a one hit wonder, East End continued to release singles but were unable to maintain an audience. In 2003, after a brief hiatus, East End released Kokoroe, a new album featuring some of the forefathers of Japanese hip hop (namely Rip Slyme, Rhymester, and Crazy-A) and attracted press attention, but failed to reenter the cultural mainstream.

East End were at first skeptical about collaborating with Yuri, an idol from the group Tokyo Performance Doll.  Yuri, being a woman, posed a possible threat to their careers since women did not frequent the hip hop scene in Japan.  Female singers were more commonly associated with pop songs and “cute” acts.  The fact that Yuri was a woman, however, was very beneficial for the group in the end.  She gave them a second chance in the recording industry after their first album did not sell as much as the producers wanted.  Having a pop star on their side then allowed East End to continue recording, a chance that the group might not have had without her.

"Da.Yo.Ne."

The group's first major single, "Da.Yo.Ne," sold 912,010 copies in 1995, reaching #7 on the weekly Oricon charts and remaining on the chart for thirty-nine weeks. 

The phrase "da yo ne" is informal Japanese, mainly used in Tokyo (and eastern Japan, more broadly). Because of this, several other versions of this song were recorded under the names West End × Yuki, North End × Mai, North East End × Mai (and others) which included local versions of the phrase, “So.Ya.Na.,” “Da.Be.Sa.,” and “Da.Cha.Ne.” respectively. A compilation album of these variations, titled Da. Yo. Ne. Local Version Ominbus, was released in 1995.

Although lasting only as a memory for many Japanese people, the song “Da.Yo.Ne.” helped spark the hip hop movement in Japan.

The song contains a sample of “Turn Your Love Around” by George Benson and a sample of “The Show” by Doug E. Fresh.

References 

Japanese hip hop groups
Japanese pop music groups